Berkshire Arts & Technology Charter Public School (BART), located in Adams, United States is a tuition-free, college-preparatory public school serving 6th through 12th grade students in Berkshire County. Students may enter in 6th through 10th grade, no new students are accepted in the 11th or 12th grade year.

BART primarily serves students in Adams, Cheshire, Clarksburg, Florida, Hancock, Lanesborough, North Adams, Pittsfield, Savoy and Williamstown. Students from other towns may enroll if space is available.

Curriculum
BART students take courses in the following disciplines:
Arts
Music
Physical fitness
English
History
Math
Science
Spanish (high school only)
Collegiate skills and junior/senior seminar

Additionally, students at BART have Community Meeting (a weekly grade-level meeting of students and their advisors often headed by an administrator), Advisory, Independent Reading Time (IRT), and Individual Learning Time (ILT). Qualifying students are able to take an enrichment course (either drama, music, or art) instead of ILT.

Technology
Technology integration
Networked multi-pedia projectors in the classrooms
School-wide wireless LAN
Apple MacBook, iMac & Mac Pro
Mac OS
Digital video cameras, and digital still cameras
Online library catalog

Arts
Arts integration
Music lab using technology
Art studio

Sports 
BART has a cross country running team, girls and boys soccer and basketball teams, and a co-ed Ultimate team. The cross country team is open to students in the 6th through 12th grade, all other teams are available to students in the 8th grade and above. BART is a member of the River Valley Athletic League (RVAL), which comprises independent and charter schools in the greater Pioneer Valley region. Students must have passing grades (70% or higher) in all classes in order to participate in school athletics to promote the idea of the scholar-athlete.

References

External links
Berkshire Arts & Technology Charter Public School
BArT Charter Public School Application
Massachusetts Charter Public School Association
Massachusetts Department of Elementary and Secondary Education

Public middle schools in Massachusetts
Educational institutions established in 2004
Charter schools in Massachusetts
Schools in Berkshire County, Massachusetts
Public high schools in Massachusetts
2004 establishments in Massachusetts